Classic Albums: Iron Maiden – The Number of the Beast is a documentary about the making of the album of the same name by the British heavy metal band Iron Maiden, released on 26 November 2001 as part of the Classic Albums documentary series. Directed by Tim Kirkby, it featured cuts from the title track, "Children of the Damned", "Run to the Hills", and "The Prisoner," in addition to extended interviews and live footage of "Hallowed Be Thy Name", recorded during the band's performance at the Rock in Rio festival in 2001.

The video reached No. 9 in the Norwegian DVD Charts, and was certified Gold by the Australian Recording Industry Association.

It was released in DVD, VHS and UMD formats, and featured subtitles in six different languages, Dutch, German, Italian, Portuguese, Spanish, and French.

Chapter listing

"The Number of the Beast"
"22 Acacia Avenue"
"The Prisoner"
"Run to the Hills"
"Children of the Damned"
"Hallowed Be Thy Name"

Bonus material

"Adrian Smith & Dave Murray Twin Guitars"
"Beast Stories"
"Reading Festival 1982"
"Nicknames"
"Rod Smallwood"
"Adrian Smith Plays 'Children of the Damned'"
"Adrian Smith Plays 'The Number of the Beast'"
"A Message from Clive Burr"
"'Hallowed Be Thy Name' Rio 2001"

 * Former Iron Maiden drummer Clive Burr used the release to publicly announce that he had been diagnosed with multiple sclerosis. After finding out about Burr's condition through the DVD itself, the band helped set up the Clive Burr MS Trust Fund, for which they raised money through several charity concerts and a live release of the "Run to the Hills" single. Burr died on 12 March 2013.

Credits
Production credits are adapted from the DVD cover notes.

Tim Kirkby – director
Nick de Grunwald – series producer
Terry Shand – executive producer
Geoff Kempin – executive producer
Jamie Rugge-Price – co-executive producer
Bous de Jong – co-executive producer
Melissa Morton-Hicks – line producer
Martin R. Smith – series production executive

Charts

Certifications

See also
 The Number of the Beast

References

Iron Maiden video albums
2001 video albums
Documentary films about heavy metal music and musicians